Rane or Ranes may refer to:

Geography
Råne River, Sweden
Rânes, a commune in the Orne department in northwestern France
Ráneš, a large island in Troms county, Norway

People

Indians 
Rane (clan), an Indian Maratha clan
 Prachi Rane (born 1997), Emerging young leader in Australia. Recipient of Young Leader of the year 2019 Australia Day Award, Australian Defence Force - Long Tan Award
Harshvardhan Rane (born 1983), Indian film actor
Jayesh Rane (born 1993), Indian footballer
Kartika Rane, Indian television and film actress, niece of Pratapsingh Rane
Narayan Rane (born 1952), former Chief Minister of Maharashtra
Nitesh Narayan Rane (born 1982), Indian politician, son of Narayan Rane
Pratapsingh Rane (born 1939), Indian politician
Rama Raghoba Rane (1918–1994), Indian Army officer, recipient of the Param Vir Chakra, India's highest military decoration
Ranjita Rane (1978/79–2021), Indian cricketer
Saili Rane (born 1993), Indian badminton player
Vishwajit Pratapsingh Rane (born 1973), Indian politician, son of Pratapsingh Rane

Datta Rane, Indian politician
Jaisingrao Rane, Indian politician
Sanyogita Rane (1923–2017), Indian politician, Goa’s first woman parliamentarian
Saraswati Rane (1913–2006), Indian classical singer
Shivram Rango Rane (1901–1970), Indian politician

Other
Josep Maria Rañé (1954), Catalan politician
F. William Rane, second head football coach of the West Virginia University Mountaineers (1893–1894)
Larry and Danny Ranes, American serial killer brothers
Rane Arroyo (1954–2010), American poet, playwright and scholar of Puerto Rican descent
Rane Willerslev, Danish anthropologist
nickname of Rauno Korpi (born 1951), Finnish ice hockey coach

Companies
The Rane Group of Companies, an Indian industrial conglomerate
Rane (Madras), involved in the manufacture and distribution of steering and suspension systems
Rane Engine Valve Limited, manufacturer of valves and valve train components for various engine applications
Rane Corporation, American pro audio equipment manufacturer

Arts and entertainment
Rane (English: The Wounds), a 1998 Serbian film
title character of Elf Princess Rane (妖精姫レーン, Yōsei Hime Rēn), an anime OVA directed by Akitaro Daichi
Charles Rane, protagonist of the 1977 film Rolling Thunder
Rane (band), an American pop jam band

Other uses
Rane Polytechnic College, a polytechnic college in Tiruchirappalli district, India